Pewee Lake is a lake in Nipissing District in Northeastern Ontario, Canada. The lake is in Algonquin Provincial Park, is part of the Saint Lawrence River drainage basin, and lies astride Ontario Highway 60.

The primary inflow is an unnamed stream arriving at the south, and the primary outflow is an unnamed stream leaving at the north. It flows to Mew Lake, then via Jack Creek, the North Madawaska River, the Madawaska River and the Ottawa River to the Saint Lawrence River.

See also
List of lakes in Ontario

References

Lakes of Nipissing District